Before the Doors: Live on I-5 is a Record Store Day exclusive 10" vinyl EP by the American rock band Soundgarden. It was released on November 25, 2011 through A&M Records.

Overview
The EP is an exclusive Black Friday Record Store Day release. The album is limited to 5000 pieces on clear orange vinyl. The EP contains 5 songs that were recorded during various sound checks on the band's 1996 tour.

Track listing
All songs written by Chris Cornell, except where noted:
"No Attention"  – 4:27
Originally from Down on the Upside.
"Never the Machine Forever" (Kim Thayil)  – 3:36
Originally from Down on the Upside
"Waiting for the Sun" (Jim Morrison)  – 4:12
"Room a Thousand Years Wide" (Matt Cameron, Thayil)  – 4:06
Originally from Badmotorfinger.
"Somewhere" (Ben Shepherd)  – 4:21
Originally from Badmotorfinger.

Tracks 1–3 recorded on December 5, 1996 at the Henry J. Kaiser Convention Center in Oakland, California
Track 4 recorded on December 7, 1996 at the Pacific National Exhibition Forum in Vancouver, British Columbia
Track 5 recorded on December 4, 1996 at the Memorial Audiotorium in Sacramento, California

Personnel
Soundgarden
Matt Cameron – drums
Chris Cornell – lead vocals, rhythm guitar
Ben Shepherd – bass 
Kim Thayil – lead guitar

References

Soundgarden EPs
Record Store Day releases
Soundgarden live albums
A&M Records live albums
A&M Records EPs
Live EPs
2011 live albums
2011 EPs